, there were 15,000 electric vehicles in Israel. , 5.2% of new cars sold in Israel were electric.

Government policy
, the Israeli government charges a 10% tax on purchases of battery electric vehicles and a 40% tax on purchases of plug-in hybrid vehicles; these taxes are slated to increase to 20% and 55% respectively in 2023.

, the Israeli government offers tax subsidies of ₪1,200 for battery electric vehicle purchases, and ₪900 for plug-in hybrid vehicle purchases.

Charging stations
, there were 1,000 public AC charging stations in Israel. , there were 120 public DC charging stations in Israel.

By district

Tel Aviv
, a majority of Israel's public charging stations were in Tel Aviv.

References

Israel
Road transport in Israel